Abhijith Vijayan, popularly known as Abhijith Kollam is an Indian playback singer, popular in Malayalam movie industry. He was born in Kollam, Kerala. Abhijith has recorded songs for more than 12 Malayalam movies and few Malayalam devotional albums. He won the Pravasi Express award for the Best Singer in the year 2018. In March 2020, Abhijith married actress Vismaya Sree at Kollam.

The resemblance of his voice to that of famous singer K. J. Yesudas caused to lost him out the Kerala State Film Awards for the Best Singer in the year 2018.

Discography

See also
 Pravasi Express Awards

References

Living people
Malayalam playback singers
Singers from Kollam
21st-century Indian singers
21st-century Indian male singers
Year of birth missing (living people)
Telugu playback singers